Spherical packing may refer to: 
 Sphere packing
 Spherical code